The 2013 Team Speedway Junior World Championship was the ninth FIM Team Under-21 World Championship season. The final took place on 28 September, 2013 in Pardubice, Czech Republic.

Denmark won their second Team Under-21 World Championship. The Danes accumulated 42 points, with Michael Jepsen Jensen top scoring for them with 16 points. Poland finished just one point behind in second with 41 points, while hosts Czech Republic finished third with 24 points.

Semi-finals

Final 

  Pardubice
 28 September 2013

Scores

See also 
 2013 Speedway World Cup
 2013 Individual Speedway Junior World Championship

References 

2013
World Team Junior